The Minister of Mines and Technical Surveys was a position in the Canadian Cabinet from 1950 to 1966.

The former offices of Minister of Mines and Resources and Minister of Reconstruction and Supply were abolished by Statute 13 Geo. VI, c. 18, and the offices of the Minister of Citizenship and Immigration, Minister of Mines and Technical Surveys and Minister of Resources and Development created by Statutes 13 Geo. VI, c. 16, 17 and 18 respectively, each assented to on 10 Dec. 1949 and proclaimed in force on 18 Jan. 1950.

Ministers 1950-1966

The new position of Minister of Energy, Mines and Resources was created on October 1, 1966.

External links
Buck Surveying

Mines and Technical Surveys
Canada
Surveying organizations